Enrique Beltrán Castillo (1903–1994) was one of Mexico's first conservationists. A student of Alfonso Herrera at the UNAM in the 1920s, Beltrán was appointed by Herrera "to head two marine commissions (in 1923 and 1926), that were established to study and improve the use of Mexico's coastal fisheries."

In 1932, Beltrán received a Guggenheim Fellowship "to consult oceanographic archives in the United States and to study protozoology at Columbia University."

After completing his doctorate in zoology at Columbia, from 1939-52 Beltrán headed the Department of Protozoology at Mexico's Institute of Health and Tropical Diseases.

With assistance from the Charles Lathrop Pack Forestry Foundation, in 1952, Beltrán founded the Mexican Institute of Renewable Natural Resources (Instituto Mexicano de Recursos Naturales Renovables, or IMERNAR), one of Mexico's first conservation organizations, serving as its director.

In 1966, he received a medal of honor from the International Union for Conservation of Nature (IUCN).

References

Notes

Bibliography 

 Marcotullio, Peter and Gordon McGranahan. 2007. Scaling urban environmental challenges: from local to global and back. United Kingdom: Earthscan. Available: books
 Simonian, Lane. 1995. Defending the Land of the Jaguar: A History of Conservation in Mexico. Austin, TX: University of Texas Press. Available:  Google books. 

1903 births
1994 deaths
Nature conservation in Mexico
National Autonomous University of Mexico alumni
Columbia University alumni
People associated with the International Union for Conservation of Nature
Marine conservation
Mexican biologists
20th-century biologists